Rolf E. Vanloo (born 1899) was a German playwright and screenwriter. He also produced the 1937 film Tango Notturno.

Selected filmography
 The Secret of Bombay (1921)
 Four Around a Woman (1921)
 The Man of Steel (1922)
 The Fire Ship (1922)
 The Homecoming of Odysseus (1922)
 The Passenger in the Straitjacket (1922)
 Maciste and the Silver King's Daughter (1922)
 Power of Temptation (1922)
 The Maharaja's Victory (1923)
 Quarantine (1923)
 Malva (1924)
 Thamar, The Child of the Mountains (1924)
 The Farmer from Texas (1925)
 I Love You (1925)
 The Spinning Ball (1927)
 The Runaway Girl (1928)
 I Kiss Your Hand, Madame (1929)
 Asphalt (1929)
 Diane (1929)
 The Informer (1929)
 Here's Berlin (1932)
 Gold (1934)
 Variety (1935)
 Dangerous Crossing (1937)
 Tango Notturno (1937)
 The Night of Decision (1938)
 Mask in Blue (1943)

References

Bibliography
 Hardt, Ursula. From Caligari to California: Erich Pommer's Life in the International Film Wars. Berghahn Books, 1996.

External links

1899 births
Year of death unknown
German male writers
German screenwriters
German male screenwriters
People from Minden
Film people from North Rhine-Westphalia